Norraca longipennis is a moth of the family Notodontidae described by Frederic Moore in 1881. It is sometimes classified as Oaura longipennis. It is found in India, Sri Lanka, Andaman Islands, Indochina, Sundaland, Java, Bali, and Philippines.

Head, thorax and forewings of the male are ochreous. Forewings with four or five fuscous lines beyond the middle. Abdomen and hindwings with a reddish tinge. Larva typical of Sphingidae with a horn on the anal somite.

References

Notodontidae
Moths of Asia
Moths of Sri Lanka
Moths of Sumatra
Moths described in 1881